Olivier Kwizera (born 30 July 1995 in Kigali, Rwanda) is a Rwandan professional footballer who plays as goalkeeper for Saudi Arabian club Al-Kawkab.

Club career

South Africa
Back in 2016, Kwizera almost signed for Maritzburg United of the South African Premier Division after being let go by APR FC.

Impressing in a trial for Free State Stars, the Kitale native was officially signed by the club in summer 2017 after getting his FIFA players intermediaries license, effectively becoming the first Rwandan goalkeeper to have played in South Africa. He left the club at the end of the 2018-19 season.

Back to Rwanda
Kwizera was without club until 27 December 2019, where he signed a six-month deal with newly promoted Rwanda Premier League club, Gasogi United Heroes FC.

Saudi Arabia
In September 2022, Kwizera joined Saudi Second Division side Al-Kawkab.

International career
The goalkeeper was unavailable for the 2015 Africa U-23 Cup of Nations second leg qualifier opposing Uganda on account of a debilitating wound on his right ankle.

References

1995 births
Living people
Rwandan footballers
Rwanda international footballers
People from Kigali
Isonga F.C. players
APR F.C. players
Bugesera FC players
Free State Stars F.C. players
Al-Kawkab FC players
South African Premier Division players
National First Division players
Saudi Second Division players
Association football goalkeepers
Rwandan expatriate footballers
Expatriate soccer players in South Africa
Rwandan expatriate sportspeople in South Africa
Expatriate footballers in Saudi Arabia
Rwandan expatriate sportspeople in Saudi Arabia
2016 African Nations Championship players
Rwanda A' international footballers
2020 African Nations Championship players